Charles Harry Webb (2 February 1908 – 15 November 2000) was an Australian politician. Born in England, he migrated to Australia in 1913 and was educated at state schools, after which he became a locomotive engineman. He rose to become Secretary of the Western Australian branch of the Australian Federated Union of Locomotive Enginemen, and was a member of the executive of the Australian Council of Trade Unions. He was also president of the Western Australian Trades Union Industrial Council, and served as president of the Western Australian Branch of the Australian Labor Party from 1946 to 1955.

In 1954, he was elected to the Australian House of Representatives as the Labor member for Swan, and transferred to the new seat of Stirling in 1955. He was defeated by the Liberal candidate in 1958, but was re-elected in 1961. He held the seat until his defeat in 1972. Webb died in 2000.

References

Australian Labor Party members of the Parliament of Australia
Members of the Australian House of Representatives for Stirling
Members of the Australian House of Representatives for Swan
Members of the Australian House of Representatives
1908 births
2000 deaths
20th-century Australian politicians
Train drivers
Australian trade unionists
British emigrants to Australia